Mark Camacho (born April 12, 1964) is a Canadian film, television and voice actor.

Career
He has starred in live-action films, but is best known for his voice acting roles, such as Oliver Frensky in Arthur, Lyle in Animal Crackers, Dad in Rotten Ralph, George Martin in Spaced Out, Harry and Dragon in Potatoes and Dragons, Jerry Atric in Samurai Pizza Cats, Gantlos in the English-language version of Winx Club, Zob in Monster Allergy, Conrad Cupmann in the Amazon Jack films and Zösky in Kaput and Zösky. He also voiced the character of Jeri Skalnic in Still Life.

In the 2007 Bob Dylan biopic I'm Not There, Camacho plays the part of Norman, based upon Dylan's manager Albert Grossman. He was later cast in Punisher: War Zone as one of Jigsaw's surviving men.

He is married to actress and fellow Montreal native Pauline Little. Their son, Jesse Camacho, is also an actor, best known for the television series Less Than Kind.

Filmography

Film

People and Science: Good Logging Is No Crime (1989, Short) as Narrator
The Amityville Curse (1990) as Krabel
Whispers (1990) as Morgue Assistant
Scanners II: The New Order (1991) as Paramedic
Snake Eater III: His Law (1991) as Scanning Customer
Canvas (1992) as Mario
Deadbolt (1992, TV Movie) as Phil
The Myth of the Male Orgasm (1993) as Tim
The Neighbor (1993) as Bank manager
Mrs. Parker and the Vicious Circle (1994) as Writer #1
Stalked (1994) as Lawyer
Dr. Jekyll and Ms. Hyde (1995) as Waiter
Rainbow (1995) as Fotoshop Assistant
Hollow Point (1996) as Police Officer at Diner
Marked Man (1996) as Drunk Driver
Rowing Through (1996) as Reporter #1
Poverty and Other Delights (1996) (Joyeux Calvaire) as Le gardien de la gare
Afterglow (1996) as Ritz-Carlton Bartender
The Peacekeeper (1997) as Presidential Aide #1
Affliction (1997) as Clyde
The Kid (1997) as Dan Albright
For Hire (1998) as Detective Lawlor
The Sleep Room (1998) as Department Store Guard
Little Men (1998) as Police Sergeant
Snake Eyes (1998) as C.J.
Going to Kansas City (1998) as Billy Ossining
Random Encounter (1998) as Mark Brewster
Out of Control (1998) as Nick
Sublet (1998) as FBI Agent Dobson
Fatal Affair (1998) as Walt Rosenbaum
Babel (1999) as Bexter
Perpetrators of the Crime (1999) as Leroy
Dead Silent (1999) as Lt. Sam Waterton
The Whole Nine Yards (2000) as Interrogator #1
Fire and Ice: The Rocket Richard Riot (2000, Documentary) as Linesman
Nowhere in Sight (2001) as Marc Cory
The Score (2001) as Sapperstein's Cousin
Heist (2001) as Jewelry Store Guard
Protection (2001) as Peter
Dead Awake (2001) as Window Washer
Abandon (2002) as Detective Rigney
The Adventures of Pluto Nash (2002) as Robot Holding Cell Clark
Tunnel (2002) as John
Twin Sisters (2002) as Cop Outside Hotel
Mambo Italiano (2003) as Johnny Christofaro
Shattered Glass (2003) as Glass' Lawyer
Jericho Mansions (2003) as Gilbert
Wicker Park (2004) as Bartender
The Ecstasy Note (2006, Short) as Henford Phelps
Let Them Eat (2006) as Sanson the Executioner / Doc
The Myth of the Male Orgasm (2007) as Tim
I'm Not There (2007) as Norman
Afterwards (2008) as Lawyer
Punisher: War Zone (2008) as Pittsy
Dead Like Me (2009) as Stage Manager
Barney's Version (2010) as Mark
The Words (2010) as Fan
Brick Mansions (2014) as Businessman Type
X-Men: Days of Future Past (2014) as Richard Nixon
Stonewall (2015) as Fat Tony
The Walk (2015) as Guy Tozzoli
We're Still Together (2016) as Cop
Nine Lives (2016) as Josh Boone
Arrival (2016) as Richard Riley (Radio Talk Show Host)
Good Sam (2019) as David Dyal
Most Wanted (2020) as Moore
Felix and the Treasure of Morgäa (Félix et le trésor de Morgäa) - 2021
Peace by Chocolate (2021) as Frank Gallant

Television

Are You Afraid of the Dark? (1992-1993) as Leonard Buckley / Delivery Workman
Sirens (1994) as Myron Perryman / Defense Lawyer
Hiroshima (1995, TV Movie) as Charles Sweeney (Pilot)
Space Cases (1996) as Warden Opus
Pretty Poison (1996, TV Movie) as Vendor 
The Girl Next Door (1998, TV Movie) as Detective Levine
The Mystery Files of Shelby Woo (1998) as Norman Emerson
Starting from Scratch (1998) as Guest Star
Bonano: A Godfather's Story (1999, TV Movie) (Guest Appearance)
Killing Moon (1999, TV Movie) as Tag Hunt
P.T. Barnum (1999, TV Movie) as Levi Lyman
Lassie (1999) as Mr. Walker
Execution of Justice (1999, TV Movie) as Coombs
The Audrey Hepburn Story (2000, TV Movie) as Tiffany's Cab Driver
The Warden (2001, TV Movie) as Sewell
Stiletto Dance (2001, TV Movie) as Rick Tucci
Dice (2001) as Macloud
Asbestos (2002) as Contremaître J. Franklin
Federal Protection (2002, TV Movie) as Joseph Pagnozzi
Agent of Influence (2002, TV Movie) as Steve Lamboise
Just a Walk in the Park (2002, TV Movie) as Jon
Obsessed (2002, TV Movie) as Sam Cavallo
Gleason (2002, TV Movie) as Sammy Birch
Rudy: The Rudy Giuliani Story (2003, TV Movie) as Tony Carbonetti
Deception (2003, TV Movie) as Detective Costello
The Wool Cap (2003, TV Movie) as Veterinarian
Il Duce Canadese (2004) as Rocco Perri
Mayday (2005) as Russian Male Voices / Luis Montoya (voice over)
The Perfect Neighbour (2005, TV Movie) as Phil
A Lover's Revenge (2005, TV Movie) as Detective Yokum
Mind Over Murder (2005, TV Movie) as Murphy
Air Emergency (2005, Documentary) as Russian Male Voices, Luis Montoya (voic eover)
One Dead Indian (2006, TV Movie) as Government Official #1
Time Bomb (2006, TV Movie) as Network Director
10.5: Apocalypse (2006) as Russ the Poker Player
Rumours (2006) as Mr. Brewer
Framed for Murder (2007, TV Movie) as Freed
Sticks and Stones (2008, TV Movie) as Craig Perkins
Infected (2008, TV Movie) as Craig Braddock
My Neighbour's Secret (2009, TV Movie) as Detective Ruiz
Less Than Kind (2009) as Hector
The Foundation (2009) as Jerry Renfrew
Real Detective (2016) as Detective King Barnett
Trickster (2020)

Animation

Simon in the Land of Chalk Drawings (1974, TV Series)
Samurai Pizza Cats (1990, TV Series) as Jerry Atric
Sharky and George (1991, TV Series) (English version)
Charlie Strap and Froggy Ball Flying High (1991)
Young Robin Hood (1991, TV Series)
Sinbad (1992)
Around the World in 80 Dreams (1992, TV Series) as Carlos
Jungledyret Hugo (1993) as Conrad (English version)
David Copperfield (1993, TV Movie)
Chip and Charlie (1993, TV Series)
The Adventures of Huckleberry Finn (1993)
Papa Beaver's Storytime (1993, TV Series) as Second Little Pig
Gino the Chicken (1995) as Gino
The Little Lulu Show (1995, TV Series)
Robinson Sucroe (1995, TV Series)
How the Toys Saved Christmas (1996) as Rascal / Rocko (English version)
Hugo The Movie Star (1996) as Conrad Cupmann (English version)
Gulliver's Travels (1996, TV Series)
Night Hood (1996, TV Series)
Arthur (1996-2003, TV Series) as Mr. Oliver Frensky (Francine and Catherine's father)
Princess Sissi (1997, TV Series) as Count Arkas
The Secret World of Santa Claus (1997) as Gruzzlebeard 
Ivanhoe (1997, TV Series)
Fennec (1997, TV Series)
Patrol 03 (1997, TV Series)
Caillou (1997, TV Series) as Police Officer
Jungle Show (1997) as Yull the Yak, Walter the Caribou and Fred the Flamingo (English version)
The Country Mouse and the City Mouse Adventures (1997-1999, TV Series) (uncredited)
Animal Crackers (1997-1999, TV Series) as Lyle
3 Friends and Jerry (1998, TV Series) as Eric
Kit and Kaboodle (1998, TV Series)
Tommy and Oscar (1999) as Caesar
Ripley's Believe It or Not! (1999, TV Series)
Flight Squad (1999, TV Series) as Dan
Mona the Vampire (1999, TV Series)
Journey to the West - Legends of the Monkey King (2000, TV Series) as Pigsy
A Miss Mallard Mystery (2000, TV Series)
Arthur's Perfect Christmas (2000, TV Movie) as Oliver Frensky / Security Guard
Wunschpunsch (2000-2001, TV Series) (English version)
Sagwa, the Chinese Siamese Cat (2001, TV Series) as Signor Polo
The Bellflower Bunnies (2001, TV Series)
Lucky Luke (2001-2003, TV Series) (English version)
X-DuckX (2001-2005, TV Series)
Spaced Out (2002) as George Martin
Fred the Caveman (2002, TV Series)
Pig City (2002, TV Series)
Fred the Caveman (2002, TV Series)
Daft Planet (2002, TV Series)
Kaput and Zösky (2002-2003, TV Series) as Zösky
Student Seduction (2003, TV Movie)
Kid Paddle (2003, TV Series)
Malo Korrigan (2003, TV Series)
Ratz (2003, TV Series) as The Captain
Flatmania (2004)
Woofy (2004) as Dad
Potatoes and Dragons (2004) as Harry / Dragon
The Boy (2004, TV Series)
Zoé Kezako (2006, TV Series)
Jungle Tales (2004, TV Series) as Bela the Bat
Tupu (2005)
Stroker and Hoop (2006) as The Fugitive
Dragon Hunters (2006, TV Series)
My Goldfish is Evil (2006, TV Series)
Monster Allergy (2006-2008, TV Series) as Zob
Muumi ja vaarallinen juhannus (2008) as Moominpappa (English version)
Tripping the Rift - Additional Voices
Tripping the Rift: The Movie (2008)
Fred's Head (2008, TV Series) as Paul Leblanc (English version)
Gofrette (2008, TV Series) as Fudge
The True History of Puss 'N Boots (2009) as Doc Marcel (English version)
Ludovic (2009, TV Series) as Dad
Winx Club (2009, TV Series) as Gantlos (English version)
Huntik: Secrets & Seekers (2009, TV Series) as Santiago / Enforcer / Rassimov
Fishtronaut (2009, TV Series)
Winx Club 3D: Magica avventura (2010)
Bad Dog (2010, TV Series)
Gene Fusion (2011)
April and the Extraordinary World (2015) as Paul (English version)
Sahara (2017) as Father Scorpion (English version)
Troll: The Tale of a Tail (2018) as Grimmer's Father, Limping Lars
3 Gold Coins - Additional Voices
The Adventures of Princess Sydney - Additional Voices
Albert Says Nature is Best! - Albert
The Animal Train - Walrus
Belphegor - Boris Williams
Billy and Buddy - Additional Voices
Bimbo - Additional Voices
Bizby - Additional Voices
Bronco Teddy - Additional Voices
Cat Tales - Additional Voices
Cosmic Cowboys - Additional Voices
Creepschool - Additional Voices
Dog's World - Additional Voices
Eo - Additional Voices
Eye of the Wolf - Additional Voices
Go Hugo Go - Conrad Cupmann (voice)
Golfer's Anonymous - Charlie, Philip
Gnou - Additional Voices
Inuk - Additional Voices
The Kids from Room 402 - Additional Voices
Kitou - Dad (voice)
Leon in Wintertime - Mr. Martin (voice)
The Magical Adventures of Quasimodo - Additional Voices
Marsupilami - Additional Voices
Martin Morning - Additional Voices
Mega Babies - Additional Voices
Mica - Additional Voices
Milo - Additional Voices
Mimi and Friends - Additional Voices
Momo - Bruno (voice)
Moot Moot - Additional Voices
My Life Me - Additional Voices
Nunavut - Additional Voices
Ocean Tales - Additional Voices
Okura - Additional Voices
Oscar and Spike - Additional Voices
Pet Pals - Additional Voices
Pipi, Pupu and Rosemary (2017, TV Series)
Pirate Family - Additional Voices
Princess Sissi - Additional Voices
Prudence Gumshoe - Inspector Duroc (voice)
Punch - Additional Voices
Rotten Ralph - Dad (voice)
Sandokan - Additional Voices
Sea Dogs - Additional Voices
Shaolin Kids - Additional Voices
Snailympics - Additional Voices
Spirou - Additional Voices
Team S.O.S. - Additional Voices
Three Little Ghosts - Additional Voices
The Three Pigs - The Big Bad Wolf (voice)
The Tofus - Additional Voices
The Triplets - Additional Voices
The Twins - Additional Voices
What's with Andy? - Mayor Simms, Elwood Larkin, Donny Decker (voice)
Wombat City - Additional Voices
X-Chromosome - Additional Voices

Video games

Jagged Alliance (1994)
Jagged Alliance: Deadly Games (1996)
Yoshi's Story (1997)
Jagged Alliance 2 (1999) as Kyle 'Shadow' Simmons
Wizardry 8 (2001)
Evolution Worlds (2002) as Bodyguards / Kashim
Splinter Cell (2002) as Thomas Gurgenidze
Rainbow Six 3: Black Arrow (2004)
Prince of Persia: Warrior Within (2004) as Sand Warriors
Splinter Cell: Chaos Theory (2005)
Still Life (2005) as Jiri Skalnic
Far Cry Instincts (2005) as Doyle
Prince of Persia: The Two Thrones (2005)
Rainbow Six: Vegas (2006)
TMNT (2007) as Max Winters
Naruto: Rise of a Ninja (2007)
Rainbow Six Vegas 2 (2008) as Dennis Cohen / Alvarez Cobrero
Assassin's Creed II (2009)

Script adaptation
The Girl Who Kicked the Hornets' Nest
The Girl Who Played with Fire
The Girl with the Dragon Tattoo
Supernatural: The Animation

Voice director
Doggy Day School
Gon
Rainbow Six: Siege
Splinter Cell: Conviction
Supernatural: The Animation (also an ADR Director)
Watch Dogs
Winx Club

Director
The Girl Who Kicked the Hornets' Nest
The Girl Who Played with Fire
The Girl with the Dragon Tattoo
Gon
Winx Club

References

External links

1964 births
Living people
Anglophone Quebec people
Canadian male film actors
Canadian people of Spanish descent
Canadian male stage actors
Canadian male television actors
Canadian male television writers
Canadian male voice actors
Canadian male screenwriters
Canadian television directors
Canadian television writers
Film directors from Montreal
Male actors from Montreal
Writers from Montreal
Canadian voice directors
20th-century Canadian male actors
21st-century Canadian male actors
20th-century Canadian screenwriters
20th-century Canadian male writers
21st-century Canadian screenwriters
21st-century Canadian male writers